ALWD Guide to Legal Citation, formerly ALWD Citation Manual, is a style guide providing a legal citation system for the United States, compiled by the Association of Legal Writing Directors. Its first edition was published in 2000, under editor Darby Dickerson. Its sixth edition, under editor Coleen M. Barger, was released in May 2017 by Wolters Kluwer.

It primarily competes with the Bluebook style, a system developed by the law reviews at Harvard, Yale, University of Pennsylvania, and Columbia. Citations in the two formats are roughly similar. However, ALWD differs from Bluebook in one key respect: Under the Bluebook system, the type styles used in citations found in academic legal articles (always footnoted) are very different from those used in citations within court documents (always cited inline). While the ALWD system follows the standard convention of footnotes within academic articles and inline citations in court documents, it rejects Bluebooks insistence on using different type styles in the two classes of documents. The ALWD type style is identical to that used in the Bluebook system for citations within court documents.

Adoption

Three U.S. jurisdictions have adopted ALWD:
 United States Court of Appeals for the Eleventh Circuit
This court accepts citations in either ALWD or Bluebook format, but also requires that citations to United States Supreme Court decisions provide both official "U.S." and West's "S.Ct." citations, when available.
 United States District Court for the District of Montana
This court specifically accepts either ALWD or Bluebook.
 United States Bankruptcy Court, Montana
This court accepts any "nationally recognized citation form", and specifically names the ALWD Citation Manual. It does not mention Bluebook by name, but given its national recognition (it is the dominant legal style guide in the United States), it should be accepted.

In addition to those, some law schools and paralegal schools have fully adopted ALWD. Law journals such as Animal Law, NAELA, and Legal Writing have also adopted ALWD. However, a lack of reliable or recent data does not appear to exist regarding school usage.

See also
 The Bluebook: a Uniform System of Citation
 Oxford Standard for Citation of Legal Authorities (OSCOLA)
 Case citation

References

External links
 The ALWD Citation Manual Aspen Publishers' dedicated ALWD Citation Manual website.
 Cornell Legal Information Institute, Introduction to Basic Legal Citation, 2006, by Peter Martin.(Discusses differences between the Bluebook and ALWD.) 
 Raktas i Bluebook ir ALWD, 2008, by Tadas Klimas.(Adapts Bluebook and ALWD to Lithuanian texts and sources.)

Bibliography
Legal citation guides